Prunum thalassicola is a species of sea snail, a marine gastropod mollusk in the family Marginellidae, the margin snails.

Members of the order Neogastropoda are mostly gonochoric and broadcast spawners. Life cycle: Embryos develop into planktonic trocophore larvae and later into juvenile veligers before becoming fully grown adults.

Description

Distribution

References

Marginellidae
Gastropods described in 2007